Vagabond  is the second novel in The Grail Quest series by English author Bernard Cornwell, first published in 2002. Set during the first stage of the Hundred Years' War, it follows Thomas of Hookton's quest to find the Holy Grail, a relic which will grant decisive victory to the possessor.

Plot summary

Arrows On The Hill
Thomas, Eleanor and Father Hobbe journey to the north of England to speak with the old Monk Brother Collimore, who knows of the Holy Grail, in city of Durham. Unknown to them, the corrupt French Cardinal, Cardinal Bessières, has dispatched his own companion, The Dominican Friar, Bernard de Taillebourg to find the Holy Grail for France. He is accompanied by the murderer of Father Ralph, Guy Vexille, Comte d'Astarac. During their journey to Durham Thomas is caught up in the Scottish invasion. Thomas participates in the Battle of Neville's Cross against the Scottish. We learn that Eleanor is pregnant with Thomas's baby. Thomas is not ready to be a father. Eleanor is frustrated by Thomas' willingness to fight and goes on to the monastery with Father Hobbe. There Eleanor and Father Hobbe come across the old monk they seek who is talking with a Dominican and Vexille. Both Eleanor and Father Hobbe are killed by Vexille. Meanwhile, the Scots lose the battle and David II is captured. Thomas is devastated when he finds out the fate of Eleanor and again vows to kill Guy Vexille. He continues back to Hookton with Robbie Douglas, a captured Scottish noble.

The Winter Siege
Thomas and Robbie travel to Hookton and find that the Dominican has also been to Hookton. Thomas meets with his old friend Sir Giles Marriott who gives him a book that his father wrote about the Grail. Thomas also receives a message from Sir Guillaume that he has been outlawed by France and his castle is under siege.

Thomas and Robbie go to Sir Guillaume's aid, but cannot do much for there are only two of them. Thomas uses his cunning by preying on small French parties and blowing up the gunpowder for French cannons. The two then rescue Sir Guillaume and travel back to La Roche-Derrien where he rediscovers Jeanette.

Jeanette convinces Thomas to retrieve her son and Thomas agrees. Thomas then leads a small raiding party to where little Charles is being held. However, he is betrayed and ends up in the Dominican's captivity. Thomas is questioned and tortured by the Dominicans. Eventually Thomas is let go and rehabilitated by his friends.

The King's Cupbearer
Meanwhile, a large Breton/French army marches on La Roche-Derrien and lays siege to it hoping to lure the nearby English army out and defeat the only remaining army that is not in one of the garrisons. It works and after a long battle which results in English victory, de Taillebourg is slain by Thomas. The victory comes with a terrible cost to Thomas for his commander and friend, the crippled Sir William Skeat is murdered by Sir Geoffrey Carr. Carr is an enemy Thomas makes during his time in Durham, who is in turn killed by Thomas and Robbie.

Thomas decides to continue searching for the Grail and kill Guy Vexille on the way.

Characters
 Thomas of Hookton - protagonist, illegitimate son of a priest, archer in the English army.
 Robbie Douglas - Captured Scottish noble, Thomas's companion.
 Sir Will Skeat - Thomas's friend & former captain in the service of the Earl of Northampton until he was crippled at Crécy. 
 Guy Vexille, Comte d'Astarac - Thomas's cousin, his father's murderer and the main antagonist.
 Sir Guillaume d'Evecque - French knight who fights for the English.
 Jeanette - Daughter of a rich Breton merchant, widow of the Count of Armorica, lover of Thomas.
 Sir Geoffrey Carr - An English knight and enemy of Thomas. 
 Sir William Douglas - Uncle of Robbie Douglas, is captured at the Battle of Neville's Cross by Lord Outhwaite. 
 Bernard de Taillebourg - Antagonist; Dominican Friar.
 Mordecai - Jewish doctor & surgeon
 Lord Outhwaite - English Aristocrat, commander at the Battle of Neville's Cross.
 Sir Thomas Dagworth - English military leader in Brittany.
 Cardinal Bessières - Corrupt French Cardinal who aspires to become Pope.
 Charles of Blois, Duke of Brittany - Kidnapper of Jeannette's son.
 King David II - King of Scotland.

Thomas of Hookton novels
2002 British novels
Fiction set in the 1340s
Novels set in the 14th century
HarperCollins books